Fly Eye Records was a record label founded by Calvin Harris in 2010. The label was first launched in May 2010 with the single "Gecko" from Mr Blink, a DJ who served as Harris' opening act. In 2014, the label formed a partnership with Sony/ATV Music Publishing. Most of the label's releases belong to the EDM genre.

The label has been closed in the end of 2016.

History
In 2010, Harris decided to create his own vanity label and named it "Fly Eye Records" after his signature fly-eye sunglasses that he handcrafted himself, which feature on the cover of his 2009 album, Ready for the Weekend. The original purpose from the label was to scout other artists that they admire without the contract restrictions of a major label. When Harris established Fly Eye Records he said stating, "My goal for Fly Eye Records is to release the most exciting club music I can get my hands on."

Artists

 
 Autoerotique
 Bart B More
 Bassjackers
 BURNS
 Calvin Harris (founder)
 DOD
 dBerrie
 Dillon Francis
 East & Young
 Eva Shaw
 Firebeatz
 GTA
 Hard Rock Sofa
 Hy5teria
 Jacob Plant
 James Doman
 Jewelz & Sparks
 Kenneth G
 Massimo Massivi
 Michael Woods
 Mike Hawkins
 Mightyfools
 Mr Blink
 Mync
 Nicky Romero
 Quintino
 R3hab
 Sikdope
 Thomas Gold
 Tommie Sunshine
 TV Noise
 twoloud
 Zen Freeman

Releases

Standard releases

References

External links
 

British record labels
Electronic dance music record labels
Record labels established in 2010
Record labels disestablished in 2016
Vanity record labels